Peter I. B. Lavan was an American philanthropist, lawyer, and name partner of law firm Stroock & Stroock & Lavan.

Early life and education 
Lavan was born in Brooklyn on August 5, 1895. He graduated from Columbia College in 1915 and Columbia Law School in 1918.

Career 
He joined Stroock & Stroock as a partner upon graduation in 1918 and became senior partner in 1943. Since then, the firm is known as Stroock & Stroock & Lavan. In 1956 he appointed by Dwight D. Eisenhower to chair the United States Committee for the United Nations.

As a philanthropist, he supported the Berkshire Theater Festival and the Academy of American Poets. The annual Peter I. B. Lavan Younger Poets Award was set up by the Academy in 1983, some well-known poets were awarded, including Rita Dove, William Logan, Jorie Graham and Christopher Merrill.

Personal life 
Lavan died of heart failure on July 29, 1988, at his home in Great Barrington, Massachusetts. He was 93 years old.

References 

1895 births
1988 deaths
20th-century American lawyers
Columbia College (New York) alumni
People from Brooklyn
20th-century American philanthropists
Columbia Law School alumni